WLGC may refer to:

 WLGC-FM, a radio station (105.7 FM) licensed to serve Greenup, Kentucky, United States
 WLGC (AM), a defunct radio station (1520 AM) formerly licensed to serve Greenup, Kentucky